Astrid Beckers (born 25 October 1965) is a German former gymnast. She competed in six events at the 1984 Summer Olympics.

References

External links
 

1965 births
Living people
German female artistic gymnasts
Olympic gymnasts of West Germany
Gymnasts at the 1984 Summer Olympics
People from Viersen
Sportspeople from Düsseldorf (region)